The first Romanian Bible translation is the Calvinist Palia de la Orăștie (Saxopolitan Old Testament) from 1581/1582. The translators were Calvinist pastors from Transylvania. The first complete translation to Romanian was made in 1688 (called "Biblia de la București"). The Old Testament was translated by Moldavian-born Nicolae Milescu in Constantinople. The translator used as his source a Septuagint published in Frankfurt in 1597. The manuscript was afterwards revised in Moldova and later brought to Bucharest, where it was again subject to revision by a team of Wallachian scholars (among whom were Radu and Şerban Greceanu) with the help of Şerban Cantacuzino and Constantin Brâncoveanu.

Before the publication of the Bucharest Bible, other partial translations were published, such as the Slavic-Romanian Gospel (1551), Coresi's Gospel (1561), The Braşov Psalm Book (1570), The New Testament of Alba Iulia (1648) and others. In September 1911, the British and Foreign Bible Society printed the Iasi Old Testament with the Nitzulescu New Testament, revised by Professor Garboviceanu and checked by Prof Alexics. This was the official BFBS text before Cornilescu was adopted in 1924, but was more literal. This text was revised by Cornilescu from 1928 and printed by the Bible Society in 1931 but has not been issued since.

Two main translations are currently used in Romanian. The Orthodox Church uses the Synodal Version, the standard Romanian Orthodox Bible translation, published in 1988 with the blessings of Patriarch Teoctist Arăpașu. Most Protestant denominations use the Bible Society translation made by Dumitru Cornilescu. The New Testament was first published in 1921, and the whole Bible with references in 1924, produced by the British and Foreign Bible Society. In 1989 appeared an unofficial revision by German publishing house Gute Botschaft Verlag (GBV); it tried to get the existing translation closer to the original manuscripts, in a form grammatically corrected and adapted according to the evolution of the modern Romanian language.

The British and Foreign Bible Society (BFBS), operating in Romania through the Interconfessional Bible Society of Romania (SBIR), brought out a special 90th anniversary definitive edition of the Cornilescu Bible in 2014, with many errors corrected.

Some notable translators are:
 Petru Pavel Aron
 Constantin Brâncoveanu – into Romanian
 Dumitru Cornilescu – Protestant, translated into Romanian
 Gala Galaction – Romanian Orthodox, translated into Romanian
 Radu and Șerban Greceanu – translated into Romanian

Comparison

False friends 

The Orthodox Bibles in the Romanian language, including the Cornilescu translation, which was initially intended to be an Orthodox translation, use the term "Malachians" or "Malacians" (i.e. "those who masturbate") for those who will not inherit the kingdom of heaven (1 Cor. 6: 9). According to Emanuel Conțac and Chrys C. Caragounis this translation is anachronistic (wrong), the word malakia changing its meaning in "masturbation" from the work of John Chrysostom (late 4th century AD).

The New Translation into Romanian Language (NTLR, Baptist, 2006, copyright by Biblica) does not have this false friend.

References

External links 
 

(interwiki :ro:Listă de traducători ai Bibliei)

Romanian
Romanian literature